Jaleh Amouzgar (born 4 December 1939 in Khoy, West Azerbaijan) is an Iranologist and a university professor.

Life
Amouzgar holds a Ph.D. from Sorbonne University in Iranistics (Iranian linguistics). She is currently chairman of the department of Ancient Iranian Culture and Languages at the Tehran University.

Prof. Amouzgar, in collaboration with Prof. Ahmad Tafazzoli, has contributed significantly to Ancient Iranian studies and the history of literature in ancient Iran. She has also associated with the Encyclopædia Iranica project at Columbia University.

She has won numerous awards including Chevalier of the Legion of Honor and Persian Cypress Award (an Iranian Cultural Heritage Prize) in 2016.

Works 
Zoroastrian myth of life
Pahlavi language, literature and instructions 
Mythological history of Iran
The first samples and the first man on legendary Iranian Shahriyar (translation)
Le Cinquieme Livre Du Denkard, Ahmad Tafazzuli (Translator), Peeters, 2001-01-01,

See also 
Iranistics
Persian culture
List of famous Persian women

References

External links
Biography of Jaleh Amouzgar
Portrait of Jaleh Amouzgar

Iranian Iranologists
Linguists of Persian
Grammarians of Persian
Linguists from Iran
Iranian grammarians
20th-century Iranian historians
University of Paris alumni
Academic staff of the University of Tehran
1939 births
People from Khoy
Living people
Iranian women academics
Iranian expatriates in France